Madrasa Salhia is one of the madrasahs of the medina of Tunis.

Localization 
It is located in 31 Sidi Ben Arous Street between Al-Zaytuna Mosque and the Kasbah.

History
Between 1928 and 1938, many madrasahs were built to help solving the accommodation crisis of Azzaytuna University students in the Medina of Tunis.
One of these madrasahs is Madrasa Hamzia that was built in 1929 while Madrasa Salhia was built in 1937 by Al Wakil Mohamed Salhi.

Architecture
The madrasa has a big hall surrounded by rooms divided into two floors.

References 

	

Salhia